The 93rd Separate Mechanized Brigade "Kholodnyi Yar" is a formation of the Ukrainian Ground Forces.

In October 2022 American military correspondent David Axe described the formation as "one of the most brutally effective" of Ukraine’s front-line brigades.

History

The brigade traces its history to the 93rd Guards Rifle Division of the Soviet Union's Red Army, formed at Valuki in April 1943 from 13th Guards and 92nd Rifle Brigades. The division fought at Kursk, Kharkiv, Budapest, and Prague, and was serving with the 53rd Army of the 2nd Ukrainian Front in May 1945. After a period as a 35th Guards Mechanized Division, and then 35th Guards Motor Rifle Division 1957–65, the division was redesignated as the 93rd Guards Motor Rifle Division in 1965. It served with the Southern Group of Forces in Hungary during the last years of the Cold War, and after the fall of the Berlin Wall was withdrawn to Ukraine from October 1990 to January 1991.

There it became part of the Ukrainian Armed Forces. In Decree 925/96(?), Colonel Anatoly Savatiovich Pushnyakov, Commander of the 93rd Mechanised Division of the 6th Army Corps, Southern Operational Command, Ukrainian Ground Forces, was promoted to General-Major.

The division appears to have been redesignated a brigade after 1996 and after 1999.

Throughout 1999, the '93rd Motor Rifle Division' conducted a series of small unit and staff officer exchanges with the 40th Infantry Division of the California Army National Guard.

On December 10, 2007, the Brigade received its Colour by the order of the President of Ukraine.

The brigade fought in the war in Donbas, defending Donetsk International Airport during the Second Battle of Donetsk Airport alongside other units. Thus, they are one of the units considered as one of the "cyborgs".

The brigade is now based in Pokrovsk. On 18 November 2015 its honorifics "Twice Red Banner Orders of Suvorov and Kutuzov" were removed as part of an Armed Forces-wide removal of Soviet awards and honorifics, but not its Kharkiv battle honor, given as a result of its participation in the 1943 Belgorod-Khar'kov Offensive Operation. On 22 August 2016 its Guards title was also removed.

In honor of the centennial year of the Ukrainian War of Independence the brigade received its second honorific title, Kholodnyi Yar (Kholodnyi Yar was a pro-Ukrainian partisan self-proclaimed state that existed from 1919 to 1922), in 2018, and thus its Kharkiv battle honour was officially removed from the full title of the unit. A new colour was also received by the brigade command which differs from the maroon colour it received in 2007.

Participation in peacekeeping missions
In the recent history of the Armed Forces of Ukraine, the 93rd Division became the first basic unit to train the first units of the peacekeeping forces. The 108th peacekeeping training center was established on the basis of the 112th Motorized Rifle Regiment of the division. Here were formed 15 rotations of the 240th battalion, which performed peacekeeping functions in the former Yugoslavia. On the basis of the 3rd Mechanized Battalion, the 71st Separate Mechanized Battalion was formed to be included in the 7th Separate Mechanized Brigade, which carried out the peacekeeping mission in Iraq in 2004–2005. It was disbanded at the end of training due to the decision to reduce the contingent. A few of its personnel were sent to replenish the 73rd Battalion. Soldiers also served in peacekeeping operations in Sierra Leone, Liberia, and Lebanon.

Russo-Ukrainian War

War in Donbas 
The brigade was deployed in the war in Donbas against the Russian army and its proxy forces. The unit fought on the frontlines from 2014 to 2016 before being recalled in March 2016. During this period, 138 soldiers were killed in action, over 1,000 were wounded, and 9 soldiers were held as prisoners of war. The brigade was involved in the battle of Ilovaisk, Avdiivka, the defence of Donetsk airport, the defence of Marinka, and the defence of Pisky. A documentary, 93: Battle for Ukraine, was made by Ukrainian director Lidia Guzhva about the brigade's role in the war, constructed primarily from videos made by members of the brigade themselves, as well as interviews with members of the brigade.

The brigade returned to the frontline. On 19 July 2016 an IFV of the brigade detonated an IED, killing two soldiers.

In June 2017 the brigade moved deeper into the disputed area near the village of Krymske and set up fortifications there "to exert stricter fire control over the enemy, and provides for a better defense."

2022 Russian invasion 
During the 2022 Russian invasion of Ukraine, the brigade was involved in the wider Northeastern Ukraine campaign by stopping the elite Russian 4th Guards Tank Division's advance in the Battle of Trostianets after it had been overextended and undersupplied due to Ukrainian partisan resistance in the Sumy Oblast.

In August 2022, the 93rd Mechanized Brigade liberated the village of Mazanivka southwest of Izium and was noted for being one of the few Ukrainian formations actively liberating Russian-occupied territory.

By September 2022, the brigade participated in the Kharkiv Oblast counteroffensive specifically moving against the Operational Group of Russian Forces Izium's vulnerable left flank. The Russian Ministry of Defence announced that Russian forces in the Izium region were "pulled out" to reinforce the Donbas. Following this, the city's mayor, Valeriy Marchenko, stated during a September 10th interview that "Izium was liberated today."

In October 2022, the 93rd Mechanized Brigade left Izium for the Battle of Bakhmut holding the northern sector of the besieged city while the 58th Motorized Infantry Brigade held the south counterattacking assaults by Russian Wagner Group mercenaries. The brigade recaptured the M03 and M06 highways east of Bakhmut. Heavy casualties have been reported on both sides for units participating in the battle and the 93rd was rotated out of the front and replaced with other units.

Brigade Order of Battle

1997 

  Division Command and Staff
  Guards Company
  110th Mechanized Regiment
  529th Mechanized Regiment
  87th Armoured Regiment
  Command and Artillery Reconnaissance Company
  198th Self-Propelled Artillery Regiment
  446th Anti-Tank Artillery Battalion
  1039th Anti-Aircraft Missile Regiment
  108th Combat Engineer Battalion
  166th Signal Battalion
  1119th Logistics Battalion
  16th Reconnaissance Battalion
  35th Electronic Warfare Company
  73rd Repair and Recovery Battalion
  89th Medical Battalion
  133rd Chemical Battalion
  16th Training Area
  Military Band

2007
1st Mechanized Battalion
 2nd Mechanized Battalion
 3rd Mechanized Battalion
 Armored Battalion

Structure 
As of 2017 the brigade's structure is as follows:

 93rd Mechanized Brigade, Cherkaske
 Headquarters & Headquarters Company
 1st Mechanized Battalion
 2nd Mechanized Battalion
 3rd Mechanized Battalion
 Tank Battalion
 20th Motorized Infantry Battalion "Dnipro"
 Brigade Artillery Group
 Headquarters & Target Acquisition Battery
 Self-propelled Artillery Battalion (2S3 Akatsiya)
 Self-propelled Artillery Battalion (2S1 Gvozdika)
 Rocket Artillery Battalion (BM-21 Grad)
 Anti-tank Artillery Battalion (MT-12 Rapira)
 Anti-Aircraft Missile Artillery Battalion
 Engineer Battalion
 Maintenance Battalion
 Logistic Battalion
 Reconnaissance Company
 Sniper Company
 Electronic Warfare Company
 Signal Company
 Radar Company
 CBRN-defense Company
 Medical Company
 Military Band

Awards
1943 received the Guards designation.
1943 received the Order of the Red Banner, and again in 1944.
1943 received the honorable name «Kharkovskaya» (later Ukrainianized as «Kharkivska»)
1943 received the Order of Suvorov, Second Class.
1945 received the Order of Kutuzov, Second Class.
On December 10, 2007, received its Colour
2018 received "Kholodnyi Yar" honorific

Traditions

Anniversaries 
Until August 22, 2018, the brigade celebrated its anniversary on May 10, considered the day of creation of the brigade.

Since 2018, August 22 is considered the anniversary, the day when the brigade was awarded the honorary name "Kholodny Yar" by Presidential Decree No. 232/2018 and a new colour was presented.

Symbolics 
On January 22, 2018, Roman Donik announced his intention to give the brigade the honorary name "Kholodny Yar", in honor of the historical area with a long military history.

Also, as part of updating the brigade symbols, the anthem of the military unit was changed. The words for the new song were written by a soldier of the press service of the 93rd OMBr, junior sergeant Vlad "Zmiy" Sord, and Serhii Vasylyuk, the frontman of the Ukrainian band "Shadow of the Sun", who wrote the music and set Stafiychuk's poem to it.

On May 10, 2018, the brigade was presented with and consecrated an honorary banner to the new honorary name "Kholodny Yar". This is only the second time in the history of the Armed Forces of Ukraine, after the 24th mechanized brigade, when a brigade received an honorary (motivational) flag in addition to the official battle flag.

In July 2018, it was announced that knives with the brigade's insignia would be developed for distinguished soldiers.

By Decree of the President of Ukraine dated August 22, 2018, No. 232/2018, the brigade was given the honorary name "Kholodny Yar". Before that, the brigade had the honorary name "Kharkivska".

On August 24, 2018, before the start of the military parade in honor of the 27th anniversary of the Independence of Ukraine, the commander of the 93rd Separate Mechanized Brigade "Kholodny Yar", Colonel Vladyslav Klochkov, received a new battle flag from the President of Ukraine, Petro Poroshenko.

On February 23, 2019, the Chief of the General Staff of the Armed Forces of Ukraine, Viktor Muzhenko, approved the new emblem of the brigade.

On May 6, 2022, the brigade was awarded the honorary award "For Honor and Courage".

Notes

References

Mechanised infantry brigades of Ukraine
Military units and formations established in the 1990s
Military units and formations of Ukraine in the war in Donbas
Military units and formations of the 2022 Russian invasion of Ukraine